Bajpe Abdul Khader Mohiddin (5 May 1938 – 10 July 2018) was an Indian politician and community activist in Beary. In 1978, he was elected as a member of the Legislative Assembly in India from the Barnwal constituency. Mohiddin was also a member of the Legislative Council from 1990 to 2002. Mohiddin was also the 'chief whip' in the Legislative Council from 1994 to 1995. He later went on to become the Minister for Higher Education and Industry, under Chief Minister J. H. Patel, from 1995 to 1999. In 2016, Mohiddin was recognized by the state government for his service with the Devaraj Urs award. He was also awarded 'Beary of the Century' by Beary's Welfare Association, Bangalore.

A biography of Mohiddin called Nannolagina Naanu was released on 20 July 2018 by the Chief minister of Karnataka, Siddaramaia. An English translation of Nannolagina Naanu  "The I Within Me"was released on 1 May 2019.

Early life and background 
Mohiddin was born to Abdul Khader and Haleema on 5th May 1938 in Bajpe village of Mangalore taluk. He completed his Graduation in Science - B.Sc from 1959 to 1961 in Vijaya College, Bangalore.

Personal life 
B. A. Mohiddin married Khateeja on 25 May 1962. The couple has four children which includes two sons A K Mustaq, Asif Masood and two daughter Haleema Shahin, Fathima Sabeena.

Political career 
Mohiddin joined Congress party in 1969, He became General secretary of Youth Congress under Sri. D B Chandregowda. Became General Secretary of KPCC under Devraj Urs in 1975 to 1980, In 1978, running from the Bantwal Assembly constituency in the Dakshina Kannada district. After that, he was denied a party ticket to contest subsequent elections. Consequently, he joined the Janata Dal party. He was Member of All India Congress Committee since 2007.

Positions held

Death 
Mohiddin died on 10 July 2018. left behind a wife-Khadeeja, sons-Abdul Khader Mushtaq and Asif Masood, and daughters-Halima Shahin and Fatima Sabina.

References 

Janata Dal politicians
1938 births
2018 deaths
Indian National Congress politicians from Karnataka
Karnataka MLAs 1978–1983
Members of the Karnataka Legislative Council